James Giles (born 1958) is a Canadian philosopher and psychologist.  He has written about personal identity and the self, mindfulness, Buddhist and Daoist philosophy, and has published theories of the reason for human hairlessness, the nature of sexual desire, sexual attraction, and gender.

Schooling and career
Giles studied at the University of British Columbia (BA, MA) and at the University of Edinburgh (PhD). In addition to teaching at UBC and Edinburgh, he has also taught at the University of Aalborg, the University of Copenhagen, Denmark, Hawaii College of Kansai University, Japan, the University of Guam, and La Trobe University, Australia. He now lectures in psychology at Roskilde University in Denmark, and at the Institute of Continuing Education, University of Cambridge.

Notable ideas

No-self theory 
Giles takes Hume's notion of personal identity being a fiction and develops it in terms of Buddhist accounts of no-self and theories of language. Giles points out that many theories of personal identity are reductive theories. They try to reduce the idea of personal identity to elements such as memory, personality, or bodily continuity. The no-self theory, however, is an eliminative theory. That is, it eliminates the idea of personal identity altogether. He allows that we are sometimes aware of psychological and emotional states that seem to give immediate awareness of self. He argues, however, that what we are aware of at these times is not a persisting self, but rather a "constructed or condensed self-image", namely "a composite of related images and meanings referring to how I see myself at that moment". These moments, however, make only rare appearances in consciousness.

Metaphysics of awareness 
In a radical interpretation of early Daoist philosophy, Giles argues that the Dao (Tao) has little to do with mysticism or cosmology. Rather, it refers to human awareness. The Daoist accounts of return and non-action, says Giles, provide us with insights into the nature of awareness and how meditative states can co-exist within and thus underpin everyday awareness. This works through what he calls the double return, or a back and forth of stillness and constant flow of awareness. Giles compares this view of awareness with ancient Greek, Buddhist, existentialist, and analytic accounts of philosophy of mind in an "extension of the global philosophical palette".

Theory of sexual desire 
Giles published his theory of sexual desire in The Nature of Sexual Desire in 2008.  Sexologists usually account for sexual desire either in terms of social constructionism or as a biological characteristic essential to reproduction. Giles rejects both these views, and attempts to show by a phenomenological approach that sexual desire is an existential need rooted in the human condition, based on a feeling of incompleteness from the experience of one's own gender as a form of disequilibrium. Although the theory shows similarities to earlier theories such as those of Thomas Nagel on sexual perversion, or of Aristophanes on romantic love in Plato's Symposium, Giles' core thesis is quite distinct. This is the idea that sexual desire is just the desire for mutual baring and caressing. Baring and caressing are thus the true objects of sexual desire.

Vulnerability and care theory of love 
The vulnerability and care theory of love was put forward by Giles in an article entitled "A Theory of Love and Sexual Desire" (1994) and later developed in his book The Nature of Sexual Desire (2004). Giles also presents his theory in a TEDx Talk'. According to Giles, romantic love is a complex of reciprocal desires for mutual vulnerability and care. One desires to be vulnerable before the beloved in order that the beloved may show care. At the same time one desires that the beloved be vulnerable before oneself in order that one may care for them. Although vulnerability has often been thought to be an unavoidable and perhaps unwanted consequence of love, Giles sees it as being an essential object of the desires of love. 

His theory has been discussed by scholars Dr. Ruth Westheimer, in her textbook Human Sexuality: a Psychosocial Perspective (2002), Dr. Barbara Keesling, in her book Sexual Pleasure: Reaching New Heights of Sexual Arousal (2005)., and Natasha McKeever in Romantic Love and Monogamy: A Philosophical Exploration (2014).

Sexual attraction 
In Sexual Attraction: The Psychology of Allure, Giles claims that the experience of sexual attraction has been ignored by scholars or confused with sexual desire. While sexual desire is an urge that is experienced as coming from within, sexual attraction is felt to have its locus in the attractive person. This experience has three components:
feeling drawn towards the attractive person, much like being drawn by a magnetic quality
a sense of helplessness in being drawn towards the person
sexual fantasies about erotic interaction with the person.

Naked love theory
Giles published his "naked love theory" of human hairlessness in 2010. He postulated that hairlessness in human beings evolved as a result of the pleasure of skin-to-skin contact between mother and child, and thus ultimately as a consequence of bipedalism. With all other primates, the infant clings to the mother's fur with its hands and feet. However, with the advent of bipedalism, ancestral human infants lost the ability to cling to their mothers with their feet, which became adapted for walking rather than grasping. Ancestral mothers who were bipedal could compensate for this by holding their infants with their newly freed arms. But carrying an infant is much work. Anything that motivated the mother to carry her infant would thus have been selected for. Naked skin was one such adaptation. Mothers with a hairless mutation, who passed this on to their infants, would have been motivated to hold the infant by the sensual pleasure of skin-to-skin contact.  This is the basis of what Giles calls maternal selection for hairless infants. This selection process would have been further driven by sexual selection for hairless sex partners, sex partners who would remind the individual of the sensual contact of infancy. The naked love theory thus explains why women and children are more hairless that adult males. For hairlessness has its origins in the mother-child relationship. According to Giles, naked skin is a precondition for the appearance of romantic love.

Books
 The Way of Awareness in Daoist Philosophy, St. Petersberg, Florida: Three Pines Press, 2020.
 Sexual Essays: Gender, Desire, and Nakedness, Lanham: Hamilton Books, 2017.
 Sexual Attraction: The Psychology of Allure, Santa Barbra: ABC-Clio, 2015.
 The Shell of When, Windways Press/Lulu.com, 2011.
 Kierkegaard and Japanese Thought (Ed.), Basingstoke, UK and New York: Palgrave Macmillan, 2008.
 The Nature of Sexual Desire, Connecticut: Praeger, 2003
 Kierkegaard and Freedom (Ed.), Basingstoke, UK and New York: Palgrave Macmillan, 2000.
 French Existentialism: Consciousness, Ethics, and Relations with Others (Ed.), Amsterdam and Atlanta : Rodopi, 1999.
 No Self to be Found: The Search for Personal Identity, Lanham: University Press of America, 1997. 
 A Study in Phenomenalism, Aalborg, Denmark: Aalborg University, 1994.

See also
Phenomenalism

References

Further reading
 James Giles (1994). "A Theory of Love and Sexual Desire". Journal for the Theory of Social Behaviour 24: 339–357. . 
 James Giles, The Nature of Sexual Desire, Westport, CT: Praeger Publishers, 2004 / Lanham, MD: University Press of America, 2008.

1958 births
20th-century Canadian male writers
20th-century Canadian philosophers
20th-century educators
20th-century essayists
20th-century Canadian psychologists
21st-century Canadian male writers
21st-century Canadian philosophers
21st-century educators
21st-century essayists
21st-century psychologists
Academics of the Institute of Continuing Education
Action theorists
University of Edinburgh alumni
Canadian essayists
Canadian ethicists
Canadian philosophers
Canadian psychologists
Canadian consciousness researchers and theorists
Continental philosophers
Existentialists
Human sexuality
Intellectual history
Kierkegaard scholars
Living people
Phenomenologists
Philosophers of culture
Philosophers of education
Philosophers of love
Philosophers of mind
Philosophers of psychology
Philosophers of religion
Philosophers of sexuality
Philosophers of social science
Philosophy academics
Philosophy writers
Theorists on Western civilization
University of British Columbia alumni
Writers about religion and science